Boomerang is a Vekoma roller coaster currently operating at Six Flags México since 1988.

History
Boomerang first started at the former Rafaela Padilla in Puebla, Puebla in Mexico, as Boomerang from 1984 to 1986 and was the first Boomerang ever built by Vekoma. Then the roller coaster was relocated to Reino Aventura as Boomerang in 1988. A couple years later in 1992, Boomerang got a new name as Escorpión (themed to a Scorpion), until 1999. When Six Flags purchased Reino Aventura and transformed the park to Six Flags México in 2000, Escorpión was renamed back to Boomerang as it is the current name in the present.

Ride
When the coaster starts, the train is pulled backwards up the lift hill, then dropped through the loading gate through a cobra roll and then one loop. At the end of this cycle the train is pulled up the lift hill at the end of the track, then dropped once again allowing the train to go back through the loops backwards. This is the standard Vekoma Boomerang roller coaster design found at forty-three different amusement parks worldwide.

References

External links
Official Website

Roller coasters in Mexico
Roller coasters introduced in 1988
Six Flags México
Roller coasters operated by Six Flags
Steel roller coasters